Smyrna High School is a 9–12 public high school in Smyrna, Delaware.

History
The school graduated its first class in 1894.  Until the mid-1990s Smyrna was considered a farm community with a small rural school. The school was built in 1970 to accommodate 2,500 students, but the total student body was about 800 in 1976 - having about 250 graduating seniors. The town has experienced a wave of economic expansion since then.  As of 2017, the Smyrna School District had doubled in population, and as a result Smyrna High School had become Delaware's eighth largest high school, with a greatly expanded academic curriculum and facilities.

Campus
The school moved to its current campus on Duck Creek Parkway in 1970 with the opening of the new Smyrna High School, having moved from the former John Bassett Moore High School on South Street. The campus underwent a $61 million renovation in 2006.

Accreditation
The school was accredited by the Middle States Association of Colleges and Schools in 1931.

Program
The school has a program for students considering a career in education.

Athletics
Smyrna High School competes in the Henlopen Conference of the Delaware Interscholastic Athletic Association (DIAA), with 42 teams in 23 sports.

The boys' school athletics program had historically been known mainly for its wrestling program, but Smyrna's population growth brought greater success in football and other sports.  A dramatic last-second defensive stop gave Smyrna the 2015 Division 1 state football championship in an upset win over Wilmington's perennial state power Salesianum School; Symrna followed up the next year with state championships in football and boys' basketball.

Smyrna also partakes in the Harvest Bowl, a football contest between the Eagles and Middletown High School. The event was cancelled back in 2001 and was resumed back in 2017.

State championships
 Softball: 1993, 2018
 Track and Field:
Boys Outdoor Division II: 1990, 1991
Girls Outdoor Division I: 2013
 Football: 2015, 2016, 2017 2022
 Basketball (boys): 2017
 Dual Team Wrestling: 
 Division II: 1993, 1995, 1996, 2003, 2005
 Division I: 2013, 2014, 2015, 2016

References

External links
 

High schools in Kent County, Delaware